|}

This is a list of electoral division results for the Northern Territory 1974 General Election in Australia.

Results by electoral division

Alice Springs 

 Preferences were not distributed.

Arnhem

Barkly

Casuarina 

 The number of votes each individual Independent received is unknown.

Elsey 

 Preferences were not distributed.
 The number of votes each individual Independent received is unknown.

Fannie Bay 

 Preferences were not distributed.
 The number of votes each individual Independent received is unknown.

Gillen

Jingili

Ludmilla 

 The number of votes each individual Independent received is unknown.

MacDonnell 

 Preferences were not distributed.

Millner 

 The number of votes each individual Independent received is unknown.

Nhulunbuy

Nightcliff

Port Darwin 

 The number of primary votes each individual Independent received is unknown.

Sanderson 

 The number of votes each individual Independent received is unknown.

Stuart

Stuart Park 

 The number of votes each individual Independent received is unknown.
 The independent candidate that came second on preferences is unknown.

Tiwi 

 Preferences were not distributed.
 The number of votes each individual Independent received is unknown.

Victoria River 

 Preferences were not distributed.
 The number of votes each individual Independent received is unknown.

See also 

 1974 Northern Territory general election
 Members of the Northern Territory Legislative Assembly, 1974–1977

References 

Results of Northern Territory elections